Coryanthes maculata is a species of orchid found in Brazil, Venezuela, Guyana and French Guiana. It is the type species of the genus Coryanthes.

References

External links

maculata
Orchids of South America
Plants described in 1831